Preston Murdoch Geren, III, known as Pete Geren (born January 29, 1952) is an American attorney and politician who served as the 20th United States Secretary of the Army from July 16, 2007, to September 16, 2009. He is a Democratic former member of the United States House of Representatives from Texas's 12th congressional district. He is the president of the Sid W. Richardson Foundation in Fort Worth, Texas and later chaired of the Institute for Defense Analyses in Alexandria, Virginia.

Early life and education

Geren was born in Fort Worth, Texas to Preston Geren Jr. He attended Georgia Tech in Atlanta, Georgia, from 1970 to 1973, where he was the starting center for the football team. He received his Bachelor of Arts from the University of Texas in 1974 and his Juris Doctor from the University of Texas School of Law in 1978.

His older brother, Charlie Geren, is a Republican member of the Texas House of Representatives from District 99 in Tarrant County.

Career
Prior to entering public service, Geren was an attorney and businessman in Fort Worth. From 1983 to 1985 he was an aide to Democrat U.S. Senator Lloyd Bentsen of Texas.

U.S. House of Representatives 
From 1989 until 1997, Geren served for four terms in the United States House of Representatives. He was first elected in a special election to succeed former Speaker of the House Jim Wright. He narrowly defeated Republican candidate, well known Fort Worth allergist Bob Lanier (not to be confused with the mayor of Houston of the same name). Geren was re-elected for three more terms, but opted not to run in 1996. He was succeeded by Kay Granger.

While in Congress, Geren was credited with coining the term "Blue Dog Democrat". Moderate and conservative Democrats in Congress chose to name their group after this term, creating the Blue Dog Coalition. Geren opined that the members had been "choked blue" by "extreme" Democrats from the left. It is related to the political term "Yellow Dog Democrat," a reference to southern Democrats said to be so loyal they would even vote for a yellow dog if it were labeled a Democrat.

Department of Defense
Geren joined the Department of Defense in September 2001 to serve as Special Assistant to the Defense Secretary with responsibilities in the areas of inter-agency initiatives, legislative affairs and special projects.

On July 29, 2005, Bush appointed Geren the acting United States Secretary of the Air Force, a position he served in until the confirmation of his successor Michael Wynne in November 2005.

Geren was the 28th Undersecretary of the Army, a post he assumed on February 21, 2006, following his nomination by President George W. Bush and confirmation by the United States Senate. As the Undersecretary, Geren was the Army's No. 2 civilian leader. He served as the deputy and senior advisor to the Secretary of the Army and was Acting Secretary in the absence of the Secretary.

In March 2007, Geren was named Acting Secretary of the United States Army by Defense Secretary Robert Gates, after Army Secretary Francis J. Harvey resigned amidst the scandal at Walter Reed Army Medical Center. On July 16, 2007, the Senate confirmed Geren as Secretary of the Army. On August 30, 2007, Geren established the independent Commission on Army Acquisition and Program Management in Expeditionary Operations to investigate the contingency contracting crisis within the army.

Later life 

Since 2011, he has been president and CEO of the Sid W. Richardson Foundation, in Fort Worth, TX.

See also

List of U.S. political appointments that crossed party lines

References

External links

Secretary of the Army official site

1952 births
Living people
Politicians from Fort Worth, Texas
United States Secretaries of the Army
United States Secretaries of the Air Force
Texas lawyers
Georgia Tech Yellow Jackets football players
University of Texas School of Law alumni
Players of American football from Texas
George W. Bush administration personnel
Obama administration personnel
Employees of the United States Senate
United States congressional aides
Democratic Party members of the United States House of Representatives from Texas
United States Under Secretaries of the Army